The Euclid City School District is a public school district located in Euclid, Ohio (USA). The school district consists of 6,303 students in 7 schools in grades K-12.

The district superintendent was Charlie Smaileck. Christopher Papouras, a Euclid High School alumnus, became the district's interim superintendent in August 2019; he was appointed as such the previous June 1. He was officially named superintendent in December 2019.

Schools
High School (grades 9-12)
 Euclid High School

 Middle Schools (grades 6-8)
 Euclid Middle School

 Elementary Schools (grades K-5)
Arbor Elementary School
Bluestone Elementary School
Chardon Hills Elementary School
Shoreview Elementary School

 Preschool
 Early Learning Village

References

External links
 Euclid City Schools
 

Euclid, Ohio
School districts in Cuyahoga County, Ohio